The Women's 10 metre platform competition at the 2017 World Championships was held on 18 and 19 July 2017.

Results
The preliminary round was started on 18 July at 10:00. The semifinals were held on 18 July at 15:30. The final was started on 19 July at 18:30.

Green denotes finalists

Blue denotes semifinalists

References

Women's 10 metre platform